{{Infobox settlement
| name = Panamá Oeste Province
| native_name = {{small|Provincia de Panamá Oeste}}
| native_name_lang = ES
| settlement_type = Province
| image_skyline = 
| image_alt = 
| image_caption =
| image_flag = Bandera de la Provincia de Panamá Oeste.svg
| flag_alt = 
| image_seal = 
| seal_alt = 
| image_shield = 
| shield_alt = 
| nickname = 
| motto = 
| image_map = File:Panama Oeste in Panama.svg
| map_alt =
| map_caption = Location of Panama Oeste Province in Panama
| pushpin_map =
| pushpin_label_position =
| pushpin_map_alt =
| pushpin_map_caption =
| coordinates = 
| coor_pinpoint = 
| coordinates_footnotes =
| subdivision_type = Country
| subdivision_name = Panama
| seat_type = Capital city
| seat = La Chorrera
| established_title = Created
| established_date = 1 January 2014
| founder = 
| government_footnotes = 
| leader_party = 
| leader_title = Governor
| leader_name = Temístocles Javier Herrera
| unit_pref = Metric
| area_footnotes = 
| area_total_km2 = 2786
| area_land_km2 = 
| area_water_km2 = 
| area_water_percent = 
| area_note = 
| elevation_footnotes =
| elevation_max_m = 
| elevation_min_m = 
| population_footnotes =
| population_total = 464038
| population_as_of = 2010 census
| population_density_km2 = auto
| population_demonym = 
| population_note = 
| timezone1 = Eastern Time
| utc_offset1 = -5
| timezone1_DST = 
| utc_offset1_DST = 
| postal_code_type = 
| postal_code = 
| area_code_type = 
| area_code = 
| iso_code = PA-10
| website = 
| footnotes = 
}}
Panamá Oeste ("West Panama" in English) is the newest province in Panama.

It was created from the five districts of Panamá Province west of the Panama Canal on 1 January 2014. The capital is La Chorrera.

 Administrative divisions 
Panamá Oeste Province is divided into 5 distritos (districts) and subdivided into 59 corregimientos''.

References 

 
Provinces of Panama